Sirius Calling is an album by the Art Ensemble of Chicago recorded in April, 2003 in Madison, Wisconsin and released in 2004 on the Pi Recordings label. It features performances by Joseph Jarman, Roscoe Mitchell and Don Moye with Malachi Favors Maghostut on what would be the final album before his death. It was recorded on April 24–26, 2003 in Madison, WI.

Reception
The Allmusic review by Scott Yanow states that "The music is as adventurous as ever ... the interplay between the four musicians, the mood variation (which ranges from jubilant to introspective sound explorations) and the wide range of tonal colors (Mitchell and Jarman play many different instruments) usually keep the concise music continually intriguing".

Track listing
 "Sirius Calling" (Art Ensemble Of Chicago) - 3:27  
 "Come on Y'all" (Art Ensemble Of Chicago) - 4:10  
 "Two-Twenty" (Jarman, Moye) - 2:23  
 "He Took a Cab to Neptune" (Art Ensemble Of Chicago) - 6:24  
 "Everyday's a Perfect Day" (Jarman, Moye) - 2:48  
 "Til Autumn" (Mitchell) - 6:07  
 "Dance of Circles" (Art Ensemble Of Chicago) - 5:39  
 "Cruising with JJ" (Art Ensemble Of Chicago) - 4:33  
 "You Can't Get Away" (Art Ensemble Of Chicago) - 3:48  
 "Taiko" (Art Ensemble Of Chicago) - 8:48  
 "There's a Message for You" (Art Ensemble Of Chicago) - 4:21  
 "Slow Tenor and Bass" (Mitchell) - 5:22  
 "Voyage" (Favors, Mitchell) - 3:32  
 "The Council" (Art Ensemble Of Chicago) - 3:30

Personnel
Roscoe Mitchell: soprano saxophone, alto saxophone, tenor saxophone, baritone saxophone, clarinet, flute, percussion 
Joseph Jarman: soprano saxophone, alto saxophone, tenor saxophone, clarinet, flute, percussion 
Famoudou Don Moye: drums, percussion 
Malachi Favors Maghostut: bass, percussion instruments

References

2004 albums
Pi Recordings albums
Art Ensemble of Chicago albums